The Markotkh is a low 90 km-long mountain range in the extreme northwest of the Greater Caucasus that, running parallel to the Black Sea coastline, encircles the Tsemes Bay and the Gelendzhik Bay.

Its Markotkh name translates from the Adyghe language as "blackberry". The main Caucasus Range lies immediately to the north.

Mountain ranges of the Caucasus
Mountain ranges of Russia
Mountains of Krasnodar Krai
Novorossiysk